The Deloitte Football Money League is a ranking of football clubs by revenue generated from football operations. It is produced annually by the accountancy firm Deloitte and released in early February of each year, describing the season most recently finished.

Summary performance timeline

The following table shows the clubs who have appeared in the rankings since the 1996–97 season, sorted by average annual rank, and drawn from the annual lists below.

Rankings by season

2021–22

2020–21

2019–20

2018–19

2017–18

2016–17

2015–16

2014–15

2013–14

2012–13

2011–12

For the fourth year running, the top 4 teams were Real Madrid, Barcelona, Manchester United and Bayern Munich, with Real Madrid becoming the first team to generate over €500 million in revenue. Manchester City, Borussia Dortmund and Napoli continued their meteoric rises up the table.

2010–11

2009–10

2008–09

2007–08

2006–07

The total revenue of the 20 richest clubs in the footballing world was over a record €3.73 billion. No side could displace Real Madrid, who remain top of football's financial rankings for the third year running after seeing their revenues leap 20% to €351.8 million during the 2006–07 season.

Manchester United displaced Barcelona in second place, the Spanish club moving down to third. Chelsea's revenue increase sees them return to the top five, into fourth place whilst Arsenal's move to the Emirates Stadium transformed their revenues moving them up to fifth place. This marked the first time any country has had three clubs in the top five of the Money League.

European champions Milan moved up to sixth place while runners-up Liverpool moved two places up to eighth. Italian champions Internazionale moved down two places to 9th while Bayern Munich moved up a spot to seventh. Juventus' relegation into Serie B saw them move nine places down to 12th place.

2005–06

The total revenue of the top 20 richest clubs in the world is now over €3.3 billion. Barcelona gained four places in the ranking for this year, making the two richest clubs both from Spain. England has the largest number of clubs in the list. A club from Portugal was added to the list for the first time. Portugal's Benfica is the third club from the Iberian Peninsula among the top 20 in the world, after Spain's Real Madrid and Barcelona.

2004–05

In the rankings for the 2004–05 season, Real Madrid longs run at the top. Three clubs that had appeared in the previous season's top twenty (Marseille, Rangers, and Aston Villa) were replaced by Lyon, Everton, and Valencia.

2003–04

In the 2003–04 season, five clubs recorded revenues of over €200m with Manchester United once again being ranked as the club with the highest revenue in Europe.

2002–03

English clubs dominated the money league for the 2002–03 season, with five Premier League clubs occupying spots in the top 10.

2001–02

2000–01

1999–2000

According to 30 June 2000 exchange rate (£1 = €1.581528)

1998–99

According to 30 June 1999 exchange rate (£1 = €1.523693)

1997–98

According to 30 June 1998 exchange rate (£1 = €1.535628)

1996–97

According to 30 June 1997 exchange rate (£1 = €1.481353)

Summary table: Number of times appearing in Top 10 and Top 20

Summary table 2000 to 2012: Some teams appearing in Top 10

Annual Review of Football Finance 2011

Record growth in Europe's top five leagues boosted revenue in the continent's football industry by 4 percent to an all-time high of 16.3 billion euros (£13.7 billion/$23.8 billion) in 2009-10. The "Big Five" had total revenue of 8.4 billion euros, a 5 percent increase over 2008-09, according to Deloitte.

In addition to that a total of €754.1m was distributed to clubs participating in the 2008–09 UEFA Champions League, with the two finalists, Barcelona and Manchester United, receiving the largest amounts. Barcelona's triumphant run to the title at Wembley in May earned them a total of €51m. Despite the loss, Manchester United got even more €53m.

See also
Forbes' list of the most valuable football clubs
List of professional sports leagues by revenue
Forbes' list of the most valuable sports teams

References

Deloitte Football Money League 2022 (rankings for the 2020–21 season) PDF
Deloitte Football Money League 2021 (rankings for the 2019–20 season) PDF
Deloitte Football Money League 2020 (rankings for the 2018–19 season) PDF
Deloitte Football Money League 2019 (rankings for the 2017–18 season) PDF
Deloitte Football Money League 2018 (rankings for the 2016–17 season) PDF
Deloitte Football Money League 2017 (rankings for the 2015–16 season) PDF
Deloitte Football Money League 2016 (rankings for the 2014–15 season) PDF
Deloitte Football Money League 2015  (rankings for the 2013–14 season) PDF
Deloitte Football Money League 2014 (rankings for the 2012–13 season) PDF
Deloitte Football Money League 2013 (rankings for the 2011–12 season) PDF
Deloitte Football Money League 2012 (rankings for the 2010–11 season) PDF
Deloitte Football Money League 2011 (rankings for the 2009–10 season) PDF
Deloitte Football Money League 2010 (rankings for the 2008–09 season) PDF
Deloitte Football Money League 2009 (rankings for the 2007–08 season) PDF
Deloitte Football Money League 2008 (rankings for the 2006–07 season) PDF
Deloitte Football Money League 2007 (rankings for the 2005–06 season) PDF
Deloitte Football Money League 2006 (rankings for the 2004–05 season) PDF
Deloitte Football Money League 2005 (rankings for the 2003–04 season) PDF
The Deloitte Football Rich List 2004 (rankings for the 2002–03 season) PDF
The Rich List 2001 (rankings for the 1999–00 season)

External links

Association football rankings
Association football records and statistics